Too Fat for 15: Fighting Back is an American reality television series on Style. The series debuted on August 9, 2010.

On March 7, 2011, The series' 16-episode Season 2 premiered. The mid-season finale aired on April 25, 2011. The second half of season 2 premiered on October 19, 2011.

Premise
The series shares the stories of various overweight teenagers who are enrolled at Wellspring Academies, and looks at their quest to lose weight.

Cast

Students

Tanisha Mitchell (Harrod) - Age 18 - Suitland, Maryland

Terinna Cypress - Age 18 - Clewiston, Florida

Miranda Nichols - Age 18 - Oakton, Virginia

Emily Hodge - Age 12 - Raleigh, North Carolina

Scotty Basso - Age 13 - Athens, Illinois

Rachel Qualley - Age 14 - Groton, Connecticut

Carsyn Nash - Age 18 - Warrenton, Virginia

Hayley Bailiff - Age 17 - Warren, Michigan

Caleb Treloar - Age 16 - Tampa, Florida

Sasha Mignoli - Age 15 - Long Island, New York

David Smith - Age 13 - Groton, Connecticut

Lia Yelsky - Age 14 - Montvale, New Jersey

Alan Kitner - Age 16 - Dallas, Texas

Ashley Renwick - Age 16 - Whitehorse, Yukon, Canada

Caroline Contessa - Age 12 - Petersburg, New York

Mackenzie Wood - Age 15 - Mexico Beach, Florida

Hannah Greatbatch - Age 13 - London, UK

Jeanne Claire-Fink - Age 12 - Slidell, Louisiana

Staff of Wellspring Academy

Dr. Daniel Kirschenbaum - Co-Founder

David Boeke - Executive Director

Jefferey Rice - Program Director

Timm Tilson - Program Director

Billy Porter - Academic Director

Jesse Oates - Program Supervisor

John Taylor - Fitness Coach

Nicole Kaysing - Fitness Coach

Elizabeth Tilson - Behavioral Coach

Heather Richardson - Behavioral Coach & Assistant Clinical Director

Lamar Lewis - Behavioral Coach (Season 2)

Sally Curry - Behavioral Coach (Season 1)

Susan Borgman - Behavioral Coach & Clinical Director

Crystal Sain - Program Coach

Hidi Horikoshi - Program Coach

James Robertson - Program Coach

Joyce Jones - Program Coach

Lisa Barros - Program Coach

Mary Valentine - Program Coach

Natasha Fischer - Program Coach

Zach Noble - Program Coach

Jessi Messner - Program Coach

Elizabeth Walker - Medical Coordinator

Mary Chauvin - Medical Coordinator

Sam Lopez - Nutritionist

Liz Krieg - Night Warden

Episodes

Season 1

Season 2

Specials

Years After The Show Ended

Tanisha Mitchell (Harrod)- Graduate of Frostburg State University and Howard University School of Law

Carsyn Nash- Professional Mixed Martial Arts fighter, currently a member of Elevation Fight Team

Hayley Bailiff- Graduate of Oakland University, now working in real estate in New York City

John Taylor- Completed doctorate degree at North Central University. Named 2016 New Jersey Charter School Teacher of the Year, and 2022 Varsity Brands National Athletic Director of the Year

Nicole Kaysing- Completed masters degree at Western Carolina University, now an instructor at Western Carolina University

References

2010s American reality television series
2010 American television series debuts
English-language television shows
Style Network original programming
2011 American television series endings
Fitness reality television series